Queen Kambujarajalakshmi or Kambuja-raja-lakshmi (Khmer: កំបុជរាចាឡាកស្មី, Thai: กัมพุชราชลักษมี) was a Semi legendary queen regnant of Chenla in Cambodia in 575-580.

Biography 

Kambujarajalakshmi was a Princess of King Shreshthavarman of Shreshthapura, and belonged to the oldest line of the Chenla royal dynasty through her mother. According to a traditional version of events, she succeeded king Vira Varman in 575, and was succeeded on the throne by her spouse, Bhavavarman I, who succeeded to the throne by marriage.  

However, there are no contemporary sources for her reign, and there are theories that she is a later invention.

References

Cambodian Hindus
6th-century Cambodian monarchs
6th-century women rulers
6th-century Cambodian women
Chenla